Marcie Maxwell (born May 2, 1955) is an American politician who served as a member of the Washington House of Representatives, representing the 41st district from 2009 to 2013.

Education 
Maxwell studied business, marketing, and real estate at Highline College in Des Moines, Washington.

Career 
Maxwell served as a member of the Renton School District Board from 2001 to 2009. She was elected to the Washington House of Representatives in November 2008 and assumed office in January 2009. She resigned from her seat to serve as Governor Jay Inslee's senior education policy advisor.

In January 2019, Maxwell announced her candidacy for mayor of Renton, Washington. She lost her bid for the mayor's office to Armondo Pavone.

Since 1989, Maxwell has worked as a realtor.

References

1955 births
Living people
Democratic Party members of the Washington House of Representatives
Women state legislators in Washington (state)
21st-century American women politicians
21st-century American politicians